Königsberg Cathedral is a Brick Gothic-style monument in Kaliningrad, Russia, located on Kneiphof island in the Pregel (Pregolya) river. It is the most significant preserved building of the former city of Königsberg, which was largely destroyed in World War II.

Dedicated to Virgin Mary and St Adalbert, it was built as the see of the Prince-Bishops of Samland in the 14th century. Upon the establishment of the secular Duchy of Prussia, it became the Lutheran Albertina University church in 1544. The spire and roof of the cathedral burnt down after two RAF bombing raids in late August 1944; reconstruction started in 1992, after the dissolution of the Soviet Union.

History

14th century to World War II
A first smaller Catholic cathedral was erected in the Königsberg Altstadt between 1297 and 1302. After the Samland bishop Johann Clare had acquired the eastern part of Kneiphof island from the Teutonic Knights in 1322, he and his cathedral chapter had a new see built at the site and ensured its autonomy by a 1333 treaty with Grand Master Luther von Braunschweig.

The construction is considered to have begun about 1330. The original building in Altstadt was subsequently demolished and materials from it were used to build the new cathedral on Kneiphof. The soil on which the cathedral was built was marshy, and so hundreds of oak poles were put into the ground before the construction of the cathedral could begin. After a relatively short period of almost 50 years, the cathedral was largely completed by 1380, while works on the interior frescoes lasted until the end of the 14th century.

The choir contained murals from the 14th and 15th centuries, late Gothic wood carvings, and medieval monuments in the Renaissance style, the chief of which was a statue of Albert, Duke of Prussia, carved by Cornelis Floris de Vriendt in 1570.

The cathedral originally had two spires. The spires (one north and one south) overlooked the entrance (west side) of the cathedral. In 1544 the two spires were destroyed by fire. The south spire was rebuilt, but the north spire was replaced by a simple gable roof. In 1640 a clock was built underneath the rebuilt spire, and from 1650 the famous Wallenrodt Library, donated by Martin von Wallenrodt, was situated underneath the gable roof.

In 1695, an organ was installed in the cathedral. In the 19th century, the organ was restored and then renewed.

On 27 September 1523, Johann Briesmann gave the first Lutheran sermon in the cathedral. From then on, until 1945, the cathedral remained Protestant.

Albert, Duke of Prussia, and some of his relatives, as well as other dignitaries, were buried in the cathedral.

Pre-World War II photos

World War II
Königsberg was the capital of East Prussia from the Late Middle Ages until 1945, and the easternmost large German city until it was conquered by the Soviet Union near the end of World War II.

In late August 1944, British bombers carried out  two-night raids on Königsberg. The first raid, on 26/27 August, largely missed the city, but the second raid, on 29/30, destroyed most of the old part of Königsberg (including Kneiphof), and the cathedral was hit. The part of the cathedral directly underneath the spire (today's Lutheran chapel) is where 20 to 25 citizens of Koenigsberg survived during the second air raid. During reconstruction in 1992, hundreds of skeletons, mostly of children, were discovered under tons of rubble in that area. The predominance of children and the circumstances of their internment cast doubt on whether the remains were in fact victims of the air raid.

Post-World War II

After the war, the cathedral remained a burnt-out shell and Kneiphof was made into a park with no other buildings. Before the war, Kneiphof had many buildings. One of the buildings was the first Albertina University building, where Immanuel Kant taught, which was situated next to the east side of the cathedral. New construction nearby includes the House of the Soviets.

Shortly after Kaliningrad was opened to foreigners in the early 1990s after the fall of the USSR, work began to reconstruct the cathedral. In 1994 a new spire was put in place using a helicopter. In 1995 a new clock was put in place. The clock has four bells (1,180 kg, 700 kg, 500 kg & 200 kg), all cast in 1995. The clock chimes every quarter of an hour. On the hour, the clock chimes by playing the first notes of Beethoven's Symphony No. 5, followed by monotonic chiming to indicate the hour. Between 1996 and 1998, work was done to construct the roof. Work was also done to put in stained glass windows.

One problem during the reconstruction was the subsidence of the cathedral which had happened over time. Even during German times, the subsidence had been evident.

Today, the cathedral has two chapels, one Lutheran, the other Russian Orthodox, as well as a museum. The cathedral is also used for concerts.

Kant's tomb

The tomb of the philosopher Immanuel Kant, the "Sage of Königsberg", is today in a mausoleum adjoining the northeast corner of the cathedral. The mausoleum was constructed by the architect Friedrich Lahrs and was finished in 1924 in time for the bicentenary of Kant's birth. Originally, Kant was buried inside the cathedral, but in 1880 his remains were moved outside and placed in a neo-Gothic chapel adjoining the northeast corner of the cathedral. Over the years, the chapel became dilapidated before it was demolished to make way for the mausoleum, which was built on the same spot, where it is today.

Other burials
Heinrich Reuß von Plauen
Johann von Tiefen
Martin Truchseß von Wetzhausen
Stanislovas Rapalionis
Luther von Braunschweig
Ludwig von Erlichshausen
Heinrich Reffle von Richtenberg
Albert, Duke of Prussia

References

External links 

  

Churches completed in 1380
Brick Gothic
Buildings and structures in Germany destroyed during World War II
Churches in Kaliningrad
Cathedrals in Russia
Churches in Kaliningrad Oblast
Cathedral
Gothic architecture in Russia
Lutheran cathedrals
Lutheran churches in Russia
Russian Orthodox cathedrals in Russia
Burial sites of the House of Schleswig-Holstein-Sonderburg-Beck
14th-century churches in Germany
Burial sites of the House of Hohenzollern
Cultural heritage monuments of federal significance in Kaliningrad Oblast